Rafael Araújo Silva or simply Rafael Araújo (born October 11, 1988 in Vitória de Santo Antão), is a Brazilian central defender.

Contract
11 July 2006 to 31 January 2008

He transferred to Comercial Atlético Clube in 2023.

External links
 CBF
Soccerway profile

1988 births
Living people
Brazilian footballers
União São João Esporte Clube players
Sport Club Corinthians Paulista players
Clube Atlético Bragantino players
Guarani FC players
Marília Atlético Clube players
Association football defenders